Réchicourt-la-Petite is a commune in the Meurthe-et-Moselle department in north-eastern France.

At a place called "le Haut des Ruelles" died the first 3 Americans on the field of France during World War 1.

See also
Communes of the Meurthe-et-Moselle department

References

Rechicourtlapetite